Faithbooking, or spiritual scrapbooking is a creative expression of a family's spiritual journey, values and events that are captured in scrapbooks, diaries or journals that combine the use of photographs, decorated papers, scripture, thoughts, prayers, blessings, stories and embellishments such as buttons, ribbon and other creative art media. The goal of faithbooking is to creatively preserve and tell a story about how a family grows spiritually. Many religions such as Christianity, Judaism and Islam have adopted the concept of faithbooking.

See also
 Grimoire
 Book of Shadows

References

Further reading
 

Handicrafts
Religious practices
Religious objects